Carly Jackson (born June 23, 1997) is a Canadian ice hockey goaltender, currently playing in the Premier Hockey Federation (PHF) with the Toronto Six. She was drafted in the first round, 3rd overall by the Buffalo Beauts in the 2020 NWHL Draft.

Playing career 

In her youth, Jackson played for the Cumberland Blues of the Nova Scotia Junior Hockey League.

In her rookie season with Maine, she was named to the Hockey East All-Academic Team, with a .911 SV% 2.84 GAA in 27 starts for the university. In 2018, she was named a WHEA All-Star Honourable Mention, after setting a single-season record for wins at the University of Maine. By the time she graduated, she would set the university's all-time records in wins, goals-against average, save percentage, and shutouts.

Professional 

In April 2020, Jackson was selected 3rd overall by the Buffalo Beauts in the PHF draft, her selection being announced by former Buffalo Sabres captain Pat Lafontaine. A few days later, she signed her first professional contract with the team for the 2020–21 NWHL season. She made 43 saves in her PHF debut, a 2-1 shootout loss to the Connecticut Whale in the Beauts' opening game of the 2020-21 season.

Style of play 

Having played baseball alongside hockey during her childhood, Jackson has been noted for the strength of her glove hand, as well as her speed and stamina.

Awards and honors

NCAA 
 Hockey East Pro-Ambitions Rookie of the Week (awarded October 17, 2016) 
2017 Hockey East All-Academic Team
2017 Maine Scholar Athlete Bronze Medal recipient
2017-18 Hockey East All-Star Honorable Mention 
Hockey East Defensive Player of the Week (Awarded January 8, 2018) 
2018 Maine Scholar Athlete Silver Medal recipient

NWHL 
 2021 NWHL Foundation Award (Buffalo Beauts representative)

 2021 NWHL Fans' 3 Stars of the Season (shared with Mikyla Grant-Mentis and Mallory Souliotis)

Finalist, 2021 NWHL Goaltender of the Year

Finalist, 2021 NWHL Newcomer of the Year *Carly Jackson Finalist, NWHL Newcomer of the Year

Personal life 
Jackson has worked as social media coordinator for Baseball Nova Scotia.

References

External links
 

1997 births
Living people
Buffalo Beauts players
Canadian expatriate ice hockey players in the United States
Canadian women's ice hockey goaltenders
Ice hockey people from Nova Scotia
Maine Black Bears women's ice hockey players
People from Amherst, Nova Scotia
Toronto Six players